GDV may refer to:

 Dawson Community Airport in Glendive, Montana
 Gas Discharge Visualization
 Gastric dilatation volvulus
 Gudivada Junction railway station, in Andhra Pradesh, India